Richard Marcus Lloyd Owen (born 14 April 1966) is an English actor. Trained at the National Youth Theatre and the Royal Academy of Dramatic Art (RADA) in London, he is known for portraying Indiana Jones's father Professor Dr. Henry Jones, Sr. in The Young Indiana Jones Chronicles between 1992 and 1993 and Paul Bowman-MacDonald in the BBC Scotland series Monarch of the Glen from 2002 to 2005. He starred as solicitor William Heelis in the film Miss Potter (2006) and commander Nathan Walker in Apollo 18 (2011). He plays the role of Elendil in the Amazon Prime fantasy series The Lord of the Rings: The Rings of Power.

Early life
Owen was born on 14 April 1966 at the Charing Cross Hospital in Westminster, London, England. He was brought up in London, although both of his parents were Welsh – his father, actor Glyn Owen (1928–2004), was from Caernarfon, Gwynedd, in north-west Wales, while his mother, actress Patricia Mort, was from Morriston in Swansea, Wales. His sister is the actress Cathy Owen (b. 1968).

Owen said he grew up around "a mob of entertaining, troublesome, fascinating" actors involved in challenging the Lord Chamberlain during some of the most exciting days of a very controversial Royal Court Theatre. When he was at Highgate School, because his father was an actor, his teachers thought that he should be able to act, too. However, at first he was not interested. "I was always made to read plays at school but I never wanted to. Then I was made to take part in a school play and I didn't want to do that either but I started to get approval for my acting. I was reasonably academic, good at sport, but somehow with the acting, people said 'that was fantastic'. So I thought, 'maybe that's what I'll do then".

At 16, Owen went straight from school to the National Youth Theatre, and subsequently received formal training at the Royal Academy of Dramatic Art (RADA) in London, after which he joined the Royal Shakespeare Company. While at RADA he managed to get an acting job and an Equity card, but when he told the principal he needed a term off, the request was denied and he was expelled from the Academy after just a year. Fortunately, Owen landed a job with Cheek by Jowl and followed the theatre company on tour around the world performing Shakespeare plays. Owen has said that he wished he had gone to university, and that he had been "in too much of a rush".

Career
Owen's breakthrough role was Professor Henry Jones, Sr., father of Indiana Jones, in eight episodes of the TV series The Young Indiana Jones Chronicles in 1992 and 1993. Subsequently, he portrayed the lead role of Paul Bowman-MacDonald in 28 episodes of the popular BBC Scotland series Monarch of the Glen between 2002 and 2005. He also played Professor Jon Ford in the BBC Northern Ireland series The Innocence Project (2006–2007). In 2014, Owen appeared in the second season of The CW's supernatural show The Originals as Ansel, Klaus's father. He also had a recurring role of the U.S. President Farrell in 2015 comedy series You, Me and the Apocalypse. In 2019, he played Dominic Swanson in ITV drama Cleaning Up. In 2022, Owen joined the cast of the Amazon Prime fantasy series The Lord of the Rings: The Rings of Power, where he plays the role of Elendil.

Owen's film career has included appearances in short films, and supporting roles in The Republic of Love (2003) (as Peter), which was based on a novel by Pulitzer Prize-winning author Carol Shields, and in Miss Potter (2006) (as a solicitor named William Heelis who married children's author Beatrix Potter). In 2011, he starred in sci-fi film Apollo 18 as Commander Nathan "Nate" Walker. He also played officer John Clive in the 2018 Hindi film Thugs of Hindostan.

However, Owen's first love has always been the theatre. Early in his professional career he was involved in the Cheek by Jowl productions of Philoctetes and the Shakespeare plays Macbeth, The Tempest and Twelfth Night. Owen's break on stage was playing Nick in Edward Albee's Who's Afraid of Virginia Woolf?, directed by Howard Davies, at the Almeida Theatre in London in 1996. Owen studied the play during his A-levels, and it is his favourite play. Other highlights of his stage career include playing Dan in Closer by Patrick Marber in 1998 and George in The York Realist by Peter Gill in 2002. Critics praised his performance in the latter play as "astonishing in its power, throttled fury and sadness" and "superb, richly voiced", and called him "a fast-rising star".

Personal life
Owen is married to actress and artist Juliette Mole. Together they have two children, Maxim (b. 1990) and Mimi (b. 1998).

Owen speaks fluent French.

Filmography

Film

Television

Stage

Radio

Video games

References

External links

Lloyd Owen at the Film & TV Database of the British Film Institute

1966 births
Living people
20th-century English male actors
21st-century English male actors
English male film actors
English male stage actors
English male television actors
English male video game actors
English male voice actors
English people of Welsh descent
People educated at Highgate School
People from the City of Westminster
National Youth Theatre members
Royal Shakespeare Company members
Alumni of RADA